The Cape-class patrol boats were  steel hull patrol boats with aluminum superstructures of the United States Coast Guard. They were unnamed until 1964, when they acquired names of U.S. capes of land. Originally designed for anti-submarine warfare (ASW), all 36 boats in this class were built at the United States Coast Guard Yard in Curtis Bay, Maryland.

History
The Cape class was originally developed as an ASW boat and as a replacement for the aging, World War II vintage, wooden 83-foot patrol boats ( in length) that were used mostly for search and rescue duties. With the outbreak of the Korean War and the requirement tasked to the Coast Guard to secure and patrol port facilities in the United States under the Magnuson Act of 1950, the complete replacement of the 83-foot boat was deferred and the 95-foot boat was used for harbor patrols. The first 95-foot hulls were laid down at the Coast Guard Yard in 1952 and were officially described as "seagoing patrol cutters". The class was named for North American geographic capes.

The Cape class was replaced by the   beginning in the late 1980s and many of the decommissioned cutters were transferred to nations of the Caribbean and South America by the Coast Guard.

Design
There were three sub-classes or types that evolved as missions for the boat changed. The Type A was outfitted primarily for ASW. The Type B was fitted more for search and rescue (SAR) with the addition of scramble nets, a towing bitt, and a large searchlight. The Type C vessels were constructed with a deck house aft of the bridge. Sixteen boats were overhauled as part of a renovation program began in the mid-late 1970s.

Units

See also
List of United States Coast Guard cutters

Notes

Footnotes

Citations

References cited

 
 U.S. Coast Guard Historian's Office.

External links
"CAPE" Class  WPBs US Coast Guard Historian's Office webpage

 
Ships of the United States Coast Guard
Ships built in Baltimore
Patrol boat classes